KISS KISS / Lucky Guy is Kim Hyun-joong's first Japanese single. It mostly consists of Japanese versions of previously released Korean songs from his mini albums Break Down and Lucky. The only original Japanese song is "Hohoemi No Chikara" (Japanese: ほほえみのちから), which is featured on one of the three available editions.

Kim Hyun-joong promoted "Kiss Kiss" (Japanese Ver.) on TV programs and released music videos for the aforementioned song and "Lucky Guy" (Japanese Ver.).

Some of the songs will be featured on Kim Hyun-joong's upcoming Japanese album Unlimited.

KISS KISS / Lucky Guy reached #61 on Oricon's Yearly Single Chart, having sold 121,547 copies.

Track listing

Normal Edition

Limited Edition Type A

Limited Edition Type B

Music videos
 "Kiss Kiss (Japanese Ver.)"
 "Lucky Guy (Japanese Ver.)"

Release history

Promotion

TV programs
TV Asahi Music Station: "Kiss Kiss" (2012/1/27)
NHK Music Japan: "Kiss Kiss" (2012/1/29)

Charts

References

External links
 
 
 

SS501 songs
2012 singles
Japanese-language songs
Songs written by Sean Alexander